Mild in the Streets: Fat Music Unplugged is a compilation album released July 1, 2016 by Fat Wreck Chords as the ninth volume in the label's Fat Music series. When it was released, five of the tracks were previously unreleased. The album containts acoustic songs by punk rock bands or punk musicians, of which most are signed with Fat Wreck Chords. The title and cover art are a reference to Wild in the Streets by the Circle Jerks.

Track listing

References

External links 
 Mild in the Streets: Fat Music Unplugged at Fat Wreck Chords

2016 compilation albums
Punk rock compilation albums